The Soltam M-65 is a 120 mm mortar that was developed by Tampella in 1953 via introduction of new baseplate for 120 Krh/40 invented by Hans Otto Donner. In 1960s Soltam Systems of Israel bought a license. The mortar system comes in two versions, a standard mortar and a long-range version.

Design
This heavy mortar is light enough to be transported by helicopter sling load, drop by parachute or carried in an APC such as the M113 Armored Personnel Carrier. It can also be towed as a normal artillery piece or even manhandled if necessary. The wheels on the carriage are the same as fitted to the M151 Jeep, and have handling rings to aid in manhandling it. All components are made of chrome-plated or stainless steel to resist wear and corrosion.

Vehicle mounted version
M3 Mk. D - a M3 Half-track based 120 mm mortar carrier (used exclusively by Israel Defense Forces until replaced by the M1064 mortar carrier),

Operators

Current operators
: Honduran Army
: Israel Defense Forces (primary user)
: Myanmar Army

: Singapore Army
: South African Army
: Turkish Land Forces 179 units
: United States Army

Former operators
Lebanese Forces
South Lebanon Army

See also
Mortier 120mm Rayé Tracté Modèle F1
Soltam K6 (US Army designation M120)
Soltam M-66
Weapons of the Lebanese Civil War

References

External links
Israeli-weapons.com
Singapore Artillery Pieces
Weapons of the Arab-Israeli Wars

Artillery of Israel
120mm mortars
Military equipment introduced in the 1950s